The Mormaer of Caithness was a vassal title mostly held by members of the Norwegian nobility based in Orkney from the Viking Age until 1350. The mormaerdom was held as fief of Scotland and the title was frequently held by the Norse Earls of Orkney, who were thus a vassal of both the King of Norway and the King of Scots. There is no other example in the history of either Norway or of Scotland in which a dynasty of earls owed their allegiance to two different kings.

The earliest reference to the title is however to that of a native Scots ruler, Donnchad, although the extent of the Scottish crown's influence so far north at the time, beyond the lands of the powerful Mormaers of Moray, is questionable. The Norse saga which mentions Donnchad does not provide a date, although the context suggests the early tenth century. Nonetheless, at least since the childhood of Thorfinn Sigurdsson in c. 1020, but possibly already several decades before, the Earls of Orkney were the controlling figures. In the Norse context the distinction between earls and kings did not become significant until the late 11th century and the Caithness mormaers therefore would have had considerable independence of action until that time.

The Pentland Firth, between Caithness and Orkney, was a stretch of water which divided the two earldoms but also united them, especially perhaps for the Norse, whose command of the seas was an important aspect of their culture. Indeed there are numerous incidents recorded in the Orkneyinga saga in which movement across these waters occurs as if the two polities were parts of a single political and cultural arena. Even in the mid-12th century it appears that a king of Norway - Eystein Haraldsson - had no difficulty in capturing Harald Maddadson, an Earl of Orkney, from his base in Thurso, Caithness. Meanwhile a Scottish king, David I, exercised control of both areas through promotion of the Scottish Church and other indirect rather than military means. In the 13th century, especially after the Norwegian defeat at the Battle of Largs and the subsequent Treaty of Perth in 1266, the distinctions hardened and the Firth became more like a "state border".

Sutherland was part of the Caithness mormaerdom for most of this title's history, but was "taken" by Alexander II from Magnus, the first "Angus" earl, and given to others for unknown reasons.

Most dates during the Norse period are approximate, but records become more detailed and historically accurate as the line of Norse jarls comes to an end. After the close of the Jarls' Saga on the death of Jon Haraldsson in 1230, the history of Caithness is "plunged into a darkness which is illuminated by very few written sources".

After the rule of Maol Íosa there was no mormaer of Caithness from c. 1350 to 1379. The title Earl of Caithness was granted to David Stewart, a younger son of the Scots king, and the mormaerdom effectively continued as an earldom from that point onwards.

Mormaers of Caithness
The list is by necessity a fragmentary one, the archives being not fully preserved, the reigns of some supposed mormaers being not fully attested, and so forth. According to the Landnámabók, Thorstein Olafsson (fl c. 850-c. 880) and Sigurd Eysteinsson “conquered Caithness, Sutherland and Moray, and more than half of Argyll [and] Thorstein ruled over these territories as King”. There is no suggestion that Thorstein was beholden to any overlord although his son-in-law Donnchad is described as a "native earl".

Norwegian interlude

In 1098 Magnus Barefoot, King of Norway deposed the Thorfinnsson brothers as Earls of Orkney and set his 8 year old son Sigurd Magnusson up in their place. This was an unprecedented occurrence, probably intended as a permanent step. Magnus then conducted two vigorous campaigns in the Hebrides and Irish Sea region. It is likely that de facto control of the mormaerdom was in his hands prior to his death during the second campaign in 1103 although "there does not seem to have been any intention on the Norwegian side" to formally take control of Caithness, which remained subject to the Scottish crown.

It is possible the native Celts regained the title at this time. in the late 11th or early 12th century, Ótarr son of Madadhan and brother-in-law of Haakon Paulsson is described as "jarl of Thurso". It is not certain that this second "Moddan of Dale" was a descendant of his earlier namesake, and there is no suggestion that Moddan himself was a jarl. Ótarr  was the brother of Helga Moddansdóttir fl. 1015-23 and a "curiously shadowy figure".

Later Norse jarls

After the failure of Harald the Younger, c.1200 William of Scotland then asked King of the Isles 
Rognvaldr Gudrodsson (Raghnall mac Gofraidh) to take Caithness on behalf of the Scottish Crown. Rognvaldr marched north, subduing the region and then returned to the Isles leaving three stewards in charge. Although not descended from previous Orcadian earls, Rognvaldr was related to these Norse magnates through his paternal grandfather's marriage to Ingibjorg, daughter of Haakon Paulsson. There is no evidence of his installation as a Mormaer of Caithness, only that he was appointed to administer the province. His tenure in Caithness seems to have been short-lived and once again Harald Maddadsson became the undisputed ruler of his northern holdings.
|-

Angus and Strathearn rulers

Jon Haraldsson's son Harald had drowned in 1226 and as there were no male heirs two parties with a claim sought the jarldom from King Haakon Haakonsson of Norway. On their return to Orkney in the autumn of 1232 in a single ship the claimants and their supporters were all lost at sea. As early as 2 October of that year the Caithness title was claimed by a member of the family of the Earl of Angus and it was to this house that Caithness and Orkney were  eventually granted.

There was no Mormaer of Caithness from c. 1350 to 1379. Alexander of Ard, the son of Maol Íosa's daughter Matilda and Weland of Ard (Aird, west of Inverness) was considered the rightful heir to Caithness but he resigned his interest in 1375 to King Robert II, possibly for a financial compensation or the king's support for his attempt to become Earl of Orkney. The power vacuum in Caithness was filled by William III, Earl of Ross. After this time the title "Earl of Caithness" was granted to David Stewart, 1st Earl of Caithness a younger son of Robert II whose successors have borne that title from then until the present day.

References

Notes

Citations

Bibliography

Primary sources

Secondary Sources

External links
 Mormaers of Caithness at the Medieval Lands Project

 

Mormaers
Scandinavian Scotland
Caithness